The Tornado is a double handed multihull class recognised as an International Class by the International Sailing Federation. It was used for the Catamaran discipline at the Olympic Games from 1976 to 2008.

Design

The boat was designed in 1967 by Rodney March from the Isle of Sheppey, England.  At the IYRU Olympic Catamaran Trials for international status, where it defeated other catamarans.

To increase its performance even further, the Tornado was modified in 2001, with a new sail plan which included a spinnaker and spinnaker boom, as well as an increased sail area of the existing sails. An additional trapeze was also added, and the jib was made self tacking.

The Tornado is among the fastest double handed catamarans, with an ISAF Small Catamaran Handicap Rating System rating of 0.934 and a D-PN of 59.0. It is the fastest catamaran in the RYA Portsmouth Yardstick scheme, with a 2015 Portsmouth Number of 634.

Events

Olympics
The Tornado was used as the equipment for the multihull discipline in the Olympic Games from 1976 through 2008, when multihulls were deselected. Please see the individual years for results Olympic Sailing Regatta

World Championships

Open

Mixed

See also
 List of multihulls

References

External links

 International Tornado Association
ISAF Tornado Microsite

 
Classes of World Sailing
Catamarans
Olympic sailing classes